Warrington Meetinghouse is a historic Quaker meeting house on PA 74 in Wellsville, Warrington Township, York County, Pennsylvania.  It was built in 1769, and is a one-story, uncoursed fieldstone building with a steeply pitched gable roof.

It was added to the National Register of Historic Places in 1975.

References

Quaker meeting houses in Pennsylvania
Churches on the National Register of Historic Places in Pennsylvania
Churches completed in 1769
Churches in York County, Pennsylvania
18th-century Quaker meeting houses
National Register of Historic Places in York County, Pennsylvania